Kevin Gerard Quinn (born May 21, 1997) is an American actor. He is known for his starring role as Xander in the Disney Channel original series Bunk'd (2015–2017), and for his roles in the 2016 Disney Channel Original Movie Adventures in Babysitting and the 2021 Netflix film A Week Away.

Early life 
Quinn was born in Chicago, and grew up in Wilmette, Illinois. His parents are Brian Quinn, an advertising executive, and Tamara Quinn, founder of Pulling Down the Moon. He has a twin sister. Growing up, Quinn was involved in Musical Theater productions at the Children's Theater of Winnetka, a lesser known theater company near his hometown.

Career 
He began his professional career by appearing in episodes of Shameless and Chicago P.D. Before being on Disney, he auditioned for season 12 of American Idol. He wound up being one of the top 60 males in the country. He then played Jonny in Steppenwolf Theater's production of Lord of the Flies, and the role of “Boy” in the Chicago Shakespeare Theater adaption of Henry V.

In 2015, Quinn was cast on the spinoff Disney Channel series Bunk'd. In 2016, he appeared in the Disney Channel Original Movie Adventures in Babysitting. In 2018, he played the supporting role of Brian Sudermill in the drama film Canal Street. In 2019, Quinn played the supporting role of Danny Scanton in the Hallmark Channel original film, A Christmas Love Story, alongside Kristin Chenoweth. 

In 2020, he played a minor role in Adam Sandler's comedy film Hubie Halloween. In 2021, Quinn starred in teen Christian musical drama, A Week Away, alongside Bailee Madison, which premiered on Netflix in March 2021.

Filmography

References

External links
 

1997 births
Male actors from Chicago
21st-century American male actors
Living people
American male television actors
American male video game actors
People from Wilmette, Illinois
New Trier High School alumni
American Idol participants